The 2016 Columbus Challenger 2 was a professional tennis tournament played on indoor hard courts. It was the third edition of the tournament which was part of the 2016 ATP Challenger Tour. It took place in Columbus, United States between 21 and 27 November 2016.

Singles main draw entrants

Seeds

 1 Rankings are as of November 14, 2016.

Other entrants
The following players received entry into the singles main draw as wildcards:
  Hugo Di Feo
  Martin Joyce
  Herkko Pöllänen
  John McNally

The following players received entry as alternates:
  Kevin King
  Austin Krajicek

The following players received entry from the qualifying draw:
  JC Aragone
  Hunter Callahan
  Aron Hiltzik
  Strong Kirchheimer

The following player received entry as a lucky loser:
  Luke Bambridge

Champions

Singles

 Stefan Kozlov def.  Tennys Sandgren 6–1, 2–6, 6–2.

Doubles

 David O'Hare /  Joe Salisbury def.  Luke Bambridge /  Cameron Norrie, 6–3, 6–4.

References

External links
 Official website

Columbus Challenger 2